The First Methodist Episcopal Church and Parsonage, now the United Methodist Church in Glendive, Montana, was listed on the National Register of Historic Places in 1988.  The church building was built in 1909;  the parsonage in 1913.  They are located at 209 N. Kendrick.  The parsonage is a Bungalow/Craftsman architecture house.  The church is Late Gothic Revival, or English Gothic architecture in style, designed by Miles City-based architect Brynjulf Rivenes.

The church was founded in 1882 and its first church building was built in 1883.

The property was listed on the National Register as part of a study of multiple historic resources in Glendive which also listed several others.

References

National Register of Historic Places in Dawson County, Montana
Gothic Revival architecture in Montana
Religious buildings and structures completed in 1913
Episcopal church buildings in Montana
Houses in Dawson County, Montana
Clergy houses in the United States
Churches completed in 1909
1909 establishments in Montana
Bungalow architecture in Montana
Churches on the National Register of Historic Places in Montana
Houses on the National Register of Historic Places in Montana